2000 is the debut year in the history of TKO Major League MMA, a mixed martial arts promotion based in Canada. Initially called Universal Combat Challenge (UCC) before rebranding to TKO Major League MMA in 2003. These early event had two 10 minute rounds and saw the promotions first Champions crowned.

Event list

TKO Major League 1: The New Beginning 

TKO/UCC Major League 1: The New Beginning was the inaugural event of TKO Major League MMA and took place on June 02, 2000. It aired on RDS.

Results

TKO Major League 2: Moment Of Truth

TKO/UCC Major League 2: Moment Of Truth was the second event of TKO Major League MMA and took place on August 12, 2000. It saw the beginning of the Inaugural Middleweight Tournament, as well as the introduction of the UCC/TKO Canadian Championships. It aired on RDS.
 
Results

References

External links
 

TKO Major League MMA
2000 in mixed martial arts